Habib Suharko (born 10 December 1928) is an Indonesian former swimmer. He competed in the men's 200 metre breaststroke at the 1952 Summer Olympics.

References

External links
 

1928 births
Living people
Indonesian male swimmers
Olympic swimmers of Indonesia
Swimmers at the 1952 Summer Olympics
Place of birth missing (living people)
Male breaststroke swimmers
20th-century Indonesian people